Symmoca vitiosella is a moth of the family Autostichidae. It is found on Cyprus and the Dodecanese Islands in the eastern Mediterranean.

References

Moths described in 1868
Symmoca
Moths of Europe
Moths of Asia